Matthias Alexander Castrén (2 December 1813 – 7 May 1852) was a Finnish Swedish ethnologist and philologist who was a pioneer in the study of the Uralic languages. He was an educator, author and linguist at the University of Helsinki.  Castrén is best known for his research in the linguistics and ethnography of the Finnic, Ugric and  Samoyedic peoples.

Early life 
Castrén was born at Tervola, in Northern Finland. His father, Christian Castrén, parish priest and vicar at Rovaniemi, died in 1825.  Castrén passed under the protection of his uncle, Matthias Castrén. At the age of twelve he was sent to school at Oulu. On entering the Alexander University at Helsinki (now University of Helsinki) in 1828 he first devoted himself to Greek and Hebrew with the intention of entering the church; but his interest was soon excited by the Finnish language and even before his course was completed he began to lay the foundations of a work on Finnish mythology. He received his bachelor's degree in 1836 and graduate degree in 1839.

Linguistic adventures 

The necessity of personal explorations among the still unwritten languages of cognate tribes soon made itself evident. In 1838 he joined a medical fellow student, Dr. Ehrström, in a journey through Lapland. This was the first of the voyages Castrén undertook in order to investigate the kinship between Finnish and several other languages. Following this he was appointed in 1840 to associate professor in Finnish and Norse languages at the University of Helsinki. In the following year, he traveled in Karelia at the expense of the Literary Society of Finland.

In 1841 he undertook, in company with Finnish philologist Elias Lönnrot, a third journey, which ultimately extended beyond the Ural as far as Obdorsk, and occupied a period of three years. Before starting on this last expedition he had published a translation into Swedish of the Finnish epic of Kalevala. Upon his return he gave to the world his Elementa grammatices Syrjaenae and Elementa grammatices Tscheremissae, 1844.

No sooner had he recovered from the illness which his last journey had occasioned than he set out, under the auspices of the Academy of St Petersburg and the Alexander University, on an exploration among the Indigenous peoples of Siberia, which resulted in a vast addition to previous knowledge, but seriously affected the health of the adventurous investigator. The first fruits of his collections were published at St. Petersburg in 1849 in the form of a Versuch einer ostjakischen Sprachlehre. In 1850 he published a treatise De affixis personalibus linguarum Altaicarum, and was appointed professor of the new chair of Finnish language and literature at the University of Helsinki. The following year saw him raised to the rank of chancellor of the university. He was busily engaged in what he regarded as his principal work, a grammar of the Samoyedic languages, when he died in 1852 at 38 years of age.

Personal life
In 1850, he married Lovisa Natalia Tengström (1830–1881), whose father Johan Jakob Tengström (1787–1858), was a professor of theoretical and practical philosophy at Alexander University. They were the parents of  newspaper publisher and elected official :sv:Robert Castrén (1851–1883).

Posthumous publications 
Five volumes of his collected works appeared from 1852 to 1858, containing respectively (1) Reseminnen från åren 1838-1844; (2) Reseberättelser och bref åren 1845-1849; (3) Föreläsningar i finsk mytologi; (4) Ethnologiska föreläsningar öfver altaiska folken; and (5) Smärre afhandlingar och akademiska dissertationer. A German translation was published by Anton Schiefner, who was also entrusted by the St Petersburg Academy with the editing of his manuscripts, which had been left to the University of Helsinki and which were subsequently published.

M. A. Castrén Society
The M. A. Castrén Society was founded in Helsinki on 22 January 1990. The Society creates contacts and fosters dialogue between Finns and other Uralic- (generally Finnic-) speaking peoples and provides assistance for the publication of literature in the Uralic languages.

References

Primary Source
 Matthias Castrén in 375 humanists 01.03.2015, Faculty of Arts, University of Helsinki

Attribution

External links
M. A. Castrén Society website

1813 births
1852 deaths
People from Tervola
People from Oulu Province (Grand Duchy of Finland)
19th-century Finnish people
Finnish philologists
Linguists from Finland
Finnish ethnologists
Finnish Finno-Ugrists
Finnish translators
Translators from Finnish
Translators to Swedish
Paleolinguists
19th-century translators
Academic staff of the University of Helsinki
Linguists of Samoyedic languages
Linguists of Sámi
Sámi studies